Agrotis amphora is a species of moth of the family Noctuidae. It is found in Kashmir.

References

Agrotis
Moths of Asia
Moths described in 1903